Holoptygma lingunca is a species of moth of the family Tortricidae. It is found in the Western Cordillera of Colombia.

The wingspan is about 24.5 mm. The ground colour of the forewings is yellow, with slight rust orange admixture sparsely dotted rust and brown. The hindwings are pale orange yellow, darker posteriorly than basally and spotted grey.

Etymology
The species name refers to shape of the lobes of the end of the uncus and is derived from Latin lingua (meaning a tongue).

References

Moths described in 2011
Atteriini
Moths of South America
Taxa named by Józef Razowski